Taft House is a historic home located at Lyme in Jefferson County, New York. It was built in 1908 and is a light wood-frame dwelling consisting of a -story gable-fronted main block and a 1-story rear kitchen wing on a limestone foundation.  Also on the property is a heavy wood-frame gable front carriage barn.

It was listed on the National Register of Historic Places in 1990.

References

Houses on the National Register of Historic Places in New York (state)
Queen Anne architecture in New York (state)
Bungalow architecture in New York (state)
American Craftsman architecture in New York (state)
Houses completed in 1908
Houses in Jefferson County, New York
National Register of Historic Places in Jefferson County, New York
1908 establishments in New York (state)